The Sakara drum is one of the four major families of Yoruba drums of Nigeria. The other families are the Dundun/Gangan or talking drum, the Batá drum and the Gbedu drum.
Each family includes drums of different sizes, with the mother drum (iya ilu) playing the lead role and other drums playing in support.
The Sakara is also made and used by the Hausa people of northern Nigeria.

The Sakara is a shallow drum with a circular body made with baked clay. 
The clay shell is perhaps ten inches in diameter and one and a half inches deep, sloping inward funnel-wise towards the back. The skin is secured to the shell with twine and tuned using pegs spaced around its body.
The men use goat skin to make the heads of these drums, or for the largest drum may use cow or antelope skin.
The fingers of one hand change the tone of the drum, while the drummer hits the face of the drum with a stick. 
When several sakara drums are played together, the iya ilu is the main voice, and dictates the pace and rhythmic style. 
The fixed pitch omele ako and omele abo drums talk rhythmically, and the smaller and higher-toned omele "chord" drum adds flavour by playing varied pitches.

The Yoruba have traditionally used Sakara drums for a variety of purposes. They are played during Yoruba wedding ceremonies. The Wéré music was traditionally played using Sakara drums to call Muslims to feast and prayer during Ramadan. 
Fuji music grew from this musical form.
The Sakara drum and the solemn-sounding Goje violin are used in Sakara music, popularized by Yusuf Olatunji, which overlays the nasalized, melismatic vocals of Islamic music on the traditional percussion instruments.

References

External links

Nigerian musical instruments
Yoruba musical instruments
African drums
Drums